This is the discography of the British progressive rock band Jethro Tull who formed in Blackpool, Lancashire in 1967. Initially playing blues rock, the band's sound soon incorporated elements of British folk music and hard rock to forge a progressive rock signature. The band were led by vocalist/flautist/guitarist Ian Anderson, and have included other significant members such as guitarist Martin Barre, drummer Doane Perry, and bassist Dave Pegg.

Albums

Studio albums

Live albums

Compilation albums

Extended plays

Singles

Notes

Videos

References

External links

Discographies of British artists
Rock music group discographies
Discography